The Philsilat Sports Association Inc. (PSAI) is the national governing body for Pencak Silat in the Philippines. It  is accredited by the Persekutuan Pencak Silat Antara Bangsa (International Pencak Silat Association) which is the governing body for the sport of Pencak Silat in the world.

External links
Official website

Philippines
Pencak Silat